The Battle of Amioun  was a battle which took place in Amioun, El-Koura, in 694 between Byzantine troops and Maronite and Monothelite Christians. The battle of Amioun devotes the independence of the first Maronite state, with Baskinta as its capital.

Lebanese researcher  Chedid al-Azar writes:
Although we are not trying to deal in warfare, a unique battle we shall mention for the impact it has left, this is the battle of south East Amyun, in the year 694, precipitated by mountain dwellers of Maronite Christian faith, as a revenge against the army of Justinian II of Byzantium, for the destruction of a monastery sheltering 350, monks adherents of Marūn, in northern Syria, near Apamea (Afamiyaħ),  from Amyun. The battle was fought by a group of Marūn adherents who had sought refuge formerly in the mountains facing Amyun, from the east and made a surprise attack, under the leadership of Yuhanna Marūn, against a contingent of the Byzantine army, which was defeated and the Marūn adherents returned to their mountainous sites, to stay in a state of isolation, which marked and stamped the history of the Maronites as dwellers of the mountains of Lebanon, by isolationism, that persisted among the mountainous adherents up to our present days and had touched their performances and deliberations in modern Lebanon.

See also 
 7th century in Lebanon
 Amioun
 Baskinta
 Byzantine Empire
 Monothelitism
 Maronite Church
 List of Lebanese battles

References

External links 
 History of the Maronites
 Official site of Amioun
 Official site of Kafaraka

Battles involving the Byzantine Empire
694
690s in the Byzantine Empire
690s conflicts
Medieval Lebanon
History of the Maronites